Southern Showdown was a two-day professional wrestling event promoted by New Japan Pro-Wrestling (NJPW). It took place on 29 and 30 June 2019 at the Festival Hall in Melbourne, Victoria, Australia and the UNSW Roundhouse in Sydney, New South Wales, Australia. The Melbourne event was streamed live on FITE TV and was made available for on demand viewing on NJPW World 72 hours later.

Production

Results

Night 1

Night 2

See also

2019 in professional wrestling
Professional wrestling in Australia

References

External links
The official New Japan Pro-Wrestling English website

2019 in professional wrestling
2019 in Australia
June 2019 events in Australia
New Japan Pro-Wrestling shows
Professional wrestling in Australia